Neo-feudalism or new feudalism is the contemporary rebirth of policies of governance, economy, and public life, reminiscent of those which were present in many feudal societies. Such aspects include, but are not limited to: Unequal rights and legal protections for common people and for nobility, dominance of societies by small and powerful elite groups of society, and relations of lordship and serfdom between the elite and the people. Obviously, former are rich and the latter poor.

Use and etymology
Generally, the term refers to a 21st century form of feudalism—akin in some respects to what was seen in Medieval Europe, but unfolding as an emerging phenomenon in modern times. In its early use, the term was deployed as both a criticism of the political Left and of the Right.

An early example critical of the Left is the essay "Neo-Feudalism" by John Kenneth Galbraith, published in 1961.

On the other hand, Jürgen Habermas used the term Refeudalisierung ("refeudalisation") in his 1962 The Structural Transformation of the Public Sphere to criticise the privatisation of the forms of communication that he believed had produced an Enlightenment-era public sphere. While not talking about "neo-feudalism" as such, later commentators have noted that these ideas are similar to the idea of neo-feudalism. Correspondingly, in 1992 Immanuel Wallerstein expressed views on global development, listing neo-feudalism among three other variants. By neo-feudalism, Wallerstein referred to autarky regions with a localised hierarchy and hi-tech goods available only for the elite.

Description
The concept of neo-feudalism may focus on economics, though it is not limited to it. Among the issues claimed to be associated with the idea of neo-feudalism in contemporary society, are: class stratification, globalization, neoconservative foreign policy, mass immigration and illegal immigration, open borders policies, multinational corporations, and "neo-corporatism".

According to Les Johnston, Clifford Shearing's theoretical approach of neo-feudalism has been influential. Shearing "use[s] this term in a limited sense to draw attention to the emergence of domains of mass private property that are 'gated' in a variety of ways".

Lucia Zedner responds that this use of neo-feudalism is too limited in scope; Shearing's comparison does not draw parallels with earlier governance explicitly enough. Zedner prefers more definitive endorsements.

Neo-feudalism entails an order defined by commercial interests and administered in large areas, according to Bruce Baker, who argues that this does not fully describe the extent of cooperation between state and non-state policing. The significance of the comparison to feudalism, for Randy Lippert and Daniel O'Connor, is that corporations have power similar to states' governance powers. Similarly, Sighard Neckel has argued that the rise of financial-market-based capitalism in the later twentieth century has represented a 'refeudalisation' of the economy.

The widening of the wealth gap, as poor and marginalized people are excluded from the state's provision of security, can result in neo-feudalism, argues Marina Caparini, who says this has already happened in South Africa. Neo-feudalism is made possible by the commodification of policing, and signifies the end of shared citizenship, says Ian Loader. A primary characteristic of neo-feudalism is that individuals' public lives are increasingly governed by business corporations, as Martha K. Huggins finds.

John Braithwaite notes that neo-feudalism brings a different approach to governance since business corporations, in particular, have this specialized need for loss reduction.

Author Jonathan Bluestein has written about neo-feudalism as a feature of social power: economic, political and martial alike. He defines the neo-feudal sovereigns as those who, while not directly referred to as lords, aristocrats, kings or emperors, still hold an equivalent power in a modern sense. That is, people who are not subject to everyday laws, can create their own laws to an extent, dominate large markets, employ immense swathes of individuals, have the means to hold a private military force, wield the economic might equivalent of entire nations, and own assets, especially real-estate, on a massive scale. In his books, Bluestein both criticizes this phenomenon, and proposes social and economic solutions for it.

Being the first to coin the term: techno-capitalist-feudalism, or TCF for short, radical political economist, Michel Luc Bellemare, released the seminal tome on the subject, titled Techno-Capitalist-Feudalism, in early September 2020. Described as the political economy of Scientific Anarchist-Communism, or structural-anarchism, TCF is a compilation of 15 years of economic research by the author, which began in the mid 2000s. According to Bellemare, the epoch of techno-capitalist-feudalism is the epoch of totalitarian-capitalism, whereby the logic of capitalism attains totalitarian dimensions and authoritarian supremacy. One of the primary characteristics of the age of techno-capitalist-feudalism would be the degeneration of the old modern class-system into a post-modern micro-caste-system, wherein an insurmountable divide and stratum now exists in-between the "1 percent" and the "99 percent", or more specifically, the state-finance-corporate-aristocracy and the workforce/population. Moreover, according to Bellemare, in the age of techno-capitalist-feudalism, the determination of values, prices, and wages is no longer based upon the old Marxist notion of socially necessary labour-time, but rather upon the arbitrary use of force and influence, namely, through an underlying set of ruling capitalist power-relations and/or ideologies, which impose by force and influence, numeric values, prices, and wage-sums upon goods and services, devoid of all considerations pertaining to labour-time. Ultimately, in the age of techno-capitalist-feudalism, whatever a capitalist entity or a set of entities can get away with in the sphere of production and/or in the marketplace is deemed valid, legitimate, and normal, regardless of labour-time expenditures. According to Bellemare, in the age of TCF, contra Marx, workers can be paid below subsistence levels, wherefore, they must now work a multiplicity of jobs and more hours in order to make ends meet. In turn, according to Bellemare, in the age of TCF, most machine-technologies are capitalist in origin, meaning, these technologies are congealed power-relations and/or ideologies that are impregnated and programmed with capitalist biases. That is, a set of specific biases that maintain, reproduce, and expand, the power of the ruling capitalist relations and ideologies, undergirding the overall system. Thereby, in the age of TCF, most capitalist machine-technologies are used to maintain, reproduce, and expand, the divisions in-between the "1 percent" and the "99 percent", by keeping the "99 percent" predominantly bolted-down upon the lower-stratums of the system, all the while, keeping the "1 percent" perched atop the upper-stratums of the system, indefinitely. In sum, in the age of TCF, the new aristocracy, that is, the capitalist aristocracy, which is synonymous with the 1 percent, concerns itself first and foremost with the accumulation of power, control, and capital, as well as, reproducing hierarchical-stasis by any means necessary. As a result, in the age of TCF, the new capitalist aristocracy does not seek to steal units of unpaid labor-time from workers, but rather, it seeks to influence and control all aspects of the workers' everyday lives. Thus, the accumulation of power, control, and capital, orchestrated by the 1 percent, their corporations, and the State, is always at the expense of the workforce/population, which itself, is gradually impoverished, disempowered, and continually relegated to the margins of the system, namely, the margins of the techno-capitalist-feudal-edifice, as wage-serfs and debt-serfs.

During the course of the years 2020-2021, Yanis Varoufakis has written and lectured much about his theory concerning neo-feudalism. He posits that traditional capitalism has evolved into a new feudal-like structure of economies and societies, which he refers to as 'techno-feudalism'. Varoufakis explains that unlike in capitalism, feudal economies have the quality of being dominated by very small groups of people, and predetermine the behaviour of markets as they see fit. Taking the example of massive online enterprises such as Facebook, Amazon and others, Varoufakis noted that such venues are primarily governed by the whims of single individuals and small teams, and thus are not truly capitalist markets of free trade, but rather feudal markets of stringent control. Others, such as Jeremy Pitt, have raised similar opinions and concerns, also noting that techno-feudalism threatens freedom of information over the Internet.
     
In early September, 2022, the radical political economist, Michel Luc Bellemare, has offered a short and direct critique of "techno-feudalism", on the grounds that "techno-feudalism" skews the facts and daily realities of workers, toiling under the jackboot of totalitarian-capitalism, or more accurately, the jackboot of "techno-capitalist-feudalism". According to Bellemare, using the term “techno-feudalism”, instead of “techno-capitalist-feudalism” is a disservice to workers. To drop the term “capitalist” from techno-capitalist-feudalism, only muddies the clear blue waters of the terminal stage of capitalist development, namely, the new dawning epoch of totalitarian-capitalism, that is, the new dystopian age of techno-capitalist-feudalism, run-amok. 
Just because the old capitalist bourgeoisie has embraced digital algorithms and invasive surveillance technologies as its own, and abstracted itself at a higher-level of socio-economic existence, away from the workforce/population, whereby, it now appears invisible and increasingly distant from the everyday lives of workers, does not mean the old capitalist bourgeoisie has vanished into thin air, or has been usurped by a strictly technological aristocracy. What has happened is that the old capitalist bourgeoisie has become a techno-capitalist-feudal-aristocracy, since, the logic of capitalism, capitalist profit, and capitalist technological innovations continue to inform and motivate this authoritarian capitalist aristocracy and all its overlapping networks of large-scale ruling power-blocs. Thereby, the specter of capitalism haunts "techno-feudalism".  The specter of capitalism haunts all the theoretical machinations and the minutia of "techno-feudalism", since, "techno-feudalism", or more accurately, "techno-capitalist-feudalism", is the result of the capital/labor relationship at its most lopsided, oppressive, and technologically dominating. The capital/labor relationship continues to hold; it continues to hold at the center of "techno-feudalism", or more accurately, "techno-capitalist-feudalism". In the sense that, the logic of capitalism pervades, envelops, infects, and poisons, all the aspects of "techno-feudalism", since, the logic of capitalism continues to be the foundation and the fundamental under-girder of "techno-feudalism", a foundation that "techno-feudalism" refuses to acknowledge, or even adequately address. Therefore, within the evolutionary whimper of "techno-feudalism", the logic of capitalism is thriving, laughing all the way to the bank, as "techno-feudalism" only empowers capitalist supremacy at the expense of workers’ liberation and self-management.

In popular culture and literature
After the financial crisis of 2007–2008, American technology billionaire Nick Hanauer stated that "our country [i.e. the United States] is rapidly becoming less a capitalist society and more a feudal society". His views were echoed by, amongst others, the Icelandic billionaire Björgólfur Thor Björgólfsson. The idea that the early 21st century boom and bust in Iceland saw the country returning to feudal structures of power was also expressed by a range of Icelandic novelists, among them Sigrún Davíðsdóttir in Samhengi hlutanna, Bjarni Bjarnason in Mannorð, Bjarni Harðarson in Sigurðar saga fóts, Böðvar Guðmundsson in Töfrahöllin, and Steinar Bragi in Hálendið: Skáldsaga.

Similar ideas are found in some Anglophone fiction. For example, Frank Herbert's Dune series of novels is set in the distant future with a neo-feudalistic galactic empire known as the Imperium. In these novels, after a series of wars known as the Butlerian Jihad humanity has come to prohibit all kinds of "thinking machine technology", even its simpler forms. Subsequently, the political balance of power in the Dune Universe gradually became dominant by a myriad of royal houses, each dominating one or several planets. Albeit operating in the distant future, the social and political dynamics of said royal houses are similar in many respects to those previously seen in medieval times.

In David Brin's near-future science fiction novel Existence, American politicians campaign on legally transitioning the United States into a neo-feudalist society.

In the year 2020, head of the World Economic Forum, Klaus Schwab published a book titled COVID-19: The Great Reset. Some right wing conspiracies on websites such as 4chan and the Daily Stormer (among other right wing websites) claim the book argues that the COVID-19 pandemic is an opportunity for politicians and governments to change the world's economies, societies and structures of government, by introducing a system of "Stakeholder Capitalism", doing so via the guidelines of a plan known as 'The Great Reset'. Schwab also refers to his goals as "The Fourth Industrial Revolution". Other authors have criticized The Great Reset as being a form of Neo-Feudalism.

See also
 Dark Enlightenment
 Neo-medievalism
 Neotribalism
 Refeudalization
 Jim Crow economy
 Bullshit Jobs ("managerial feudalism")

References

External links 
 Mutation of Medieval Feudalism Into Modern Corporate Capitalism: The Rise of Neofeudalism in Corporate Governance

Feudalism
Political theories
Social theories
Economic systems
Criminology